Jasper Orlando Slingsby Duncombe, 7th Baron Feversham, (born 14 March 1968), also known as The Porn Baron, is a British nobleman and producer of pornographic films.

Biography
Feversham is the eldest son of the late Peter Duncombe, 6th Baron Feversham, and was educated at Gordonstoun with Prince Edward.  After serving three years in prison for attempted robbery while high on cocaine, he founded the pornographic film companies Tongue in Cheek and Relish XXX, the latter of which sells titles to National Health Service fertility clinics and sperm banks.  They also install vending machines with VHS cassettes and DVDs in pub lavatories.

He was estranged from his father in the years before the latter's death due to his father's disapproval of his career choice, and was thus disinherited from his father's £46-million estate. However, as eldest son, he succeeded to the barony itself on his father's death on 29 March 2009.

He lives in Fulham, London.

Marriage and child
Feversham is married to Candida Boddington and they have one child who is heir apparent to the barony:

 Hon Orlando Balthazar Duncombe (born 2009).

Notes 

British pornographic film producers
1968 births
Living people
Barons in the Peerage of the United Kingdom
Eldest sons of British hereditary barons
Jasper
People educated at Gordonstoun